Democracy and Freedom (DiL) was an electoral alliance in Catalonia established to contest the 2015 Spanish general election. It was formed by Democratic Convergence of Catalonia (CDC), Democrats of Catalonia (DC) and Reagrupament (RI.cat).

History
After the 2015 Catalan regional election had seen Democratic Convergence of Catalonia (CDC) and Republican Left of Catalonia (ERC) teaming up into the Junts pel Sí alliance, speculation arose on the future of such alliance for other electoral contests and on whether it would be maintained ahead of the upcoming 2015 Spanish general election scheduled for 20 December under a "super-creative formula". On 30 October 2015, it was confirmed that they both parties would be standing in separate lists but with "shared manifestos", as ERC's refusal to accept regional presidency minister and government spokesperson Francesc Homs as the leading candidate as well as CDC's aims to control the future parliamentary group put down any prospects of a full-fledged electoral alliance.

On 4 November, it was unveiled that CDC was in talks with Democrats of Catalonia (DC) to form a joint list for the general election. On 6 November 2015, the alliance was made public and announced to include CDC, DC and Reagrupament (RI.cat) under the "Democracy and Freedom" label, with Francesc Homs as its leading candidate. The party memberships of both CDC and DC ratified the decision with a support of 84% and 78%, respectively.

On 9 May 2016, CDC announced its intention to contest the 2016 Spanish general election on its own, choosing not to renew the alliance with DC and RI.cat, thus bringing the coalition to an end. DC and RI.cat subsequently decided not to contest the general election, citing the failure in building up a "broad alliance" of pro-independence parties as their main reason.

Composition

Electoral performance

Cortes Generales

Nationwide

Regional breakdown

Notes

References

External links

2015 establishments in Catalonia
2016 disestablishments in Catalonia
Catalan independence movement
Defunct political party alliances in Spain
Defunct political parties in Catalonia
Political parties established in 2015
Political parties disestablished in 2016